Giuseppe Lombrassa (20 June 1906 – 26 September 1966) was an Italian Fascist politician and soldier, State Undersecretary for Corporations in 1942-1943 and High Commissioner for the Province of Ljubljana from June to August 1943.

Biography
He joined the Fascist squads in his youth, participating in the March on Rome at age sixteen. After graduating in law, he collaborated with various Fascist magazines; during the 1930s he fought in the Second Italo-Ethiopian War and in the Spanish Civil War, with the rank of Lieutenant in the 1st Infantry Regiment "Volontari del Littorio" of the Corps of Volunteer Troops, receiving a War Cross for Military Valor and two Silver Medals of Military Valor and being wounded in action three times and promoted to Captain for war merit. On 31 October 1938, after returning from Spain, he was appointed Undersecretary for Internal Migrations, and in 1939 he became a member of the Chamber of Fasces and Corporations.

After Italy's entry into World War II he enlisted again in the Army, fighting on the Greek front as a Captain in the 21st Infantry Division Granatieri di Sardegna, where he was awarded another War Cross for Military Valor in November 1940 and wounded in 1941. In the same year he was appointed State Commissioner for Migration and Colonization, and was involved in the recruitment campaign aimed at supplying Italian workers (Gastarbeitnehmer) to the German war industry.

On 26 February 1942 he was appointed State Undersecretary for Corporations, a post he held until 2 June 1943. In August 1942 he informed Foreign Minister Galeazzo Ciano that a serious shortage of workforce was impending, and that greater mobilization of the civilian population would be required for the functioning of the war industry. On 15 June 1943 he was appointed prefect and High Commissioner of the Province of Ljubljana, replacing Emilio Grazioli. This assignment proved to be short-lived, as Lombrassa resigned two months later following the fall of the Fascist regime and the establishment of the Badoglio government.

After the Armistice of Cassibile, Lombrassa joined the Republican Fascist Party, but did not hold important posts within the Italian Social Republic. He retired to private life postwar, and died in Rome in 1966.

References

1906 births
1966 deaths
Italian prefects
Members of the Chamber of Fasces and Corporations
Italian military personnel of World War II
Italian Fascism
National Fascist Party politicians